Aedes (Aedimorphus) jamesi is a species complex of zoophilic mosquito belonging to the genus Aedes. It is found in India and Sri Lanka.

References

External links
Aedimorphus Theobald, 1903

jamesi